Lloyd John Rice (September 11, 1928 – September 19, 1996) was a Canadian sprint canoer who competed in the late 1950s. He finished tenth in the K-1 10000 m event at the 1956 Summer Olympics in Melbourne.

References

Lloyd Rice's profile at Sports Reference.com

1928 births
Canadian male canoeists
Canoeists at the 1956 Summer Olympics
Olympic canoeists of Canada
1996 deaths